Blumentritt is a German surname. Notable people with the surname include:

 Ferdinand Blumentritt (1853–1913), Austrian ethnographer
 Günther Blumentritt (1892–1967), German general
 Volker Blumentritt (born 1946), German politician

See also
 Blumentritt Road
 Blumentritt LRT Station
 Blumentritt railway station

German-language surnames